Charlene Kaye (born September 12, 1986) is an American singer-songwriter, most widely known for her solo work under the name KAYE and as a former lead vocalist for San Fermin.

Career

Early solo career 
In 2011, Kaye released the song "Dress and Tie", a duet with Darren Criss.

She released her second full-length album Animal Love in 2012. It reached #15 on the iTunes pop charts in the week of release and received praise from PopMatters and support from Glamour. VH1 called it "at once classic and contemporary, a mix of glam rock and classical music in just the right measures" and The New Yorker described it as "a richly orchestrated pop album".

In March 2011 and 2013, Kaye played at the SXSW Music Festival in Austin, Texas.

Miracle Musical: Hawaii: Part II 
Kaye was involved in the Miracle Musical album Hawaii: Part II, the side project of Tally Hall member Joe Hawley, which released on December 12, 2012.

Kaye wrote and provided vocals for the eighth song in the album Hawaii: Part II. Kaye's likeness was also used in the Labyrinth music video released on December 14, 2014.

San Fermin 
In April 2014, Kaye joined the collective San Fermin replacing the former vocalist Rae Cassidy. She toured behind the band's previously released record San Fermin and later, as a full member, recorded the band's following two records, Jackrabbit (2015) and Belong (2017). In April 2019, the band announced that, after five years, Kaye was leaving to pursue her solo career.

Her final performance was on April 26, 2019, at San Fermin's special concert to promote their new live record Live At The Fillmore (2019) and their documentary film No Promises.

KAYE 
While touring with San Fermin on their Jackrabbit tour, Kaye began a new solo project under the name KAYE. Her first release was a pair of promotional singles, "Honey" and "UUU", in July 2016. She released a five-track EP on September 29, 2016, titled Honey. This was followed by three non-album singles, "Parakeeter" (November 2016), "Cheshire Kitten" (July 2017) and "Bamboo" (September 2017). In April 2019, Kaye was focusing on writing and recording music as KAYE full-time.

Personal life
Kaye was born in Honolulu, Hawaii. She grew up outside Phoenix, Arizona, also living for a time in Singapore, Hong Kong and Michigan during childhood. She began playing music at an early age, taking lessons in violin, piano, guitar, ukulele, saxophone and clarinet.

Kaye attended the University of Michigan as an English major, where she met Team Starkid with which she went on their S.P.A.C.E. Tour, where she was able to promote her music for the first time, and then kept performing throughout the years. 

Kaye lives in New York City.

Discography

As Charlene Kaye 
Albums
 Things I Will Need in the Past (2008)
 Animal Love (2012)

EPs and Remix Compilations
Charlene Kaye & The Brilliant Eyes EP (2012)
 Animal Love // Remixes (2013)

Singles
"Skin and Bones (ft. Darren Criss)" (2008)
 "Dress and Tie (ft. Darren Criss)" (2011)
 "Animal Love I" (2012)
 "Hummingbird Heart" (2012)
 "Forever Is a Long Time" (2012)
 "Animal Love II" (2013)
 "Woman Up (Dave Scalia Remix) [ft. Kalae Nouveau]" (2013)

As KAYE 
Albums
 Conscious Control (2020)

EPs
 HONEY EP (2016)
 Neon God EP (2022)

Singles
 "Honey" (2016)
 "UUU" (2016)
"Parakeeter" (2016)
 "Cheshire Kitten" (2017)
"Bamboo" (2017)

With San Fermin
Albums
 Jackrabbit (2015)
 Belong (2017)
Live At The Fillmore (2019)

Singles
 "Jackrabbit" (2015)
 "No Devil" (2015)
 "Shiver" with Sam Amidon (2016)
 "Open" (2017)
 "No Promises" (2017)
 "Bride" (2017)
 "Belong" (2017)
 "Asleep on the Train" (2017)

References

1986 births
Living people
Musicians from Honolulu
American pop keyboardists
American pop guitarists
American rock guitarists
American rock keyboardists
University of Michigan College of Literature, Science, and the Arts alumni
Writers from Honolulu
21st-century American women guitarists
21st-century American guitarists
Guitarists from Hawaii
21st-century American women singers
21st-century American singers